King Invincible is a 2017 Nigerian epic and action movie written and produced by Femi Adesina. The movie was written in 2003, the production started in 2015 and was not produced until 2017. The movie that fused the themes of love and war starred notable actors and actresses such as Omowunmi Dada, Segun Dada, Tope Tedela, Gabriel Afolayan, Bimbo Manuel, Peter Fatomilola, Jude Chukwuka. The movie was supported and sponsored by LASACO Assurance, EbonyLive TV, African Magic, TVC and Channels TV.

Settings 
The movie was set in the Ancient Yoruba Kingdom.

Synopsis 
The movie revolves around a  warlord who was cursed for sinning against the gods. His curse is a gradual transitioning into wolf. The movie became complicated on his quest to find the cure as he is obstructed by another powerful character.

Awards and nominations 
It was nominated at the AMVCA for best costume.

Cast 
Tope Tedela, Gabriel Afolayan, Omowunmi Dada, Bimbo Manuel,  Segun Dada and Obafemi Adisa.

References 

2017 films
English-language Nigerian films
Nigerian epic films